Buried Alive is a hardcore punk/metalcore band from Buffalo, New York that existed in the late 1990s and was signed to Victory Records. The band featured the now current singer of Terror, Scott Vogel, who had previously sang in Slugfest and Despair, and played drums in Cinderblock and Fadeaway.

Buried Alive were at the forefront of the late 1990s hardcore scene and despite their short-lived career, are credited with influencing many of today's more popular hardcore acts. BA's genre defying power was best seen by the diversity of bands they toured with, including Snapcase, Vision of Disorder, 7 Seconds, Kid Dynamite, Hot Water Music, Elliott, Skarhead, Converge, Candiria, All Out War, and Reach the Sky. Lead singer Scott Vogel disbanded the outfit to form Los Angeles hardcore band Terror. Primary songwriters Matt Roberts and Joe Orlando still perform together in the Buffalo-based band MOTHER RED. Buried Alive was asked to contribute an unreleased and exclusive song for Redstar Records to use on their Various Artists compilation, The Sound and the Fury, following a show they played headlining for Every Time I Die and Kid Gorgeous in 1999, but it did not happen. The unreleased song was later released on their Watchmen Session '98 demo EP.

The band reformed in 2020 to record Death Will Find You on Bridge 9 Records. The four-track EP is their first recording in two decades.

Band members
 Scott Vogel – vocals
 Matty Robberts – guitar
 Scotty Spring – guitar
 Joey Orlando – bass
 Kev Corcoran – drums

Former members
 Jesse Muscato – drums

Discography
 "Six Month Face" 7" (1999) (Victory Records)
 The Death of Your Perfect World (1999) (Victory Records)
 Split 7" w/Reach the Sky (2000) (Indecision Records)
 Last Rites (2001) (Victory Records)
 Watchmen Session – Demo '98 (2018)
 "Death Will Find You" 7" (2020) (Bridge 9 Records)
 "The Episcopalian" 12" w/ Sloth Finger ( Fruitbowl Records)

References

External links
 
 Interview w/Scott Vogel at Lambgoat.com

Heavy metal musical groups from New York (state)
Metalcore musical groups from New York (state)
Victory Records artists